The Sangihe white-eye (Zosterops nehrkorni) is a species of bird in the white-eye family. It is endemic to Sangihe, Indonesia.

Its natural habitat is subtropical or tropical moist montane forests. It is threatened by habitat loss.

It was formerly considered conspecific with black-crowned white-eye (Zosterops atrifrons), but work by Pamela C. Rasmussen and her colleagues showed that it is a separate species. The same research also confirmed the specific status of the Seram white-eye, Zosterops stalkeri.

References

 P. C. Rasmussen, J. C. Wardill, F. R. Lambert and J. Riley On the specific status of the Sangihe White-eye Zosterops nehrkorni, and the taxonomy of the Black-crowned White-eye Z. atrifrons complex: Forktail 16 (2000): 69-80

External links
Species factsheet - BirdLife International

Sangihe white-eye
Birds of the Sangihe Islands
Endemic birds of Sulawesi
Critically endangered fauna of Asia
Sangihe white-eye
Taxa named by August Wilhelm Heinrich Blasius
Taxonomy articles created by Polbot